The Land of Spirit and Light is an album by American violinist and composer Michael White, featuring performances recorded in 1973 and released on the Impulse! label.

Reception
The AllMusic review awarded the album 4½ stars stating "The Land of Spirit and Light is a spiritual jazz classic. Ambitious, outrageously creative, and aesthetically restless, it is simply one of the finest outings on the Impulse! label".

Track listing
All compositions by Michael White except as indicated
 "The Land of Spirit and Light (Part 1)" - 2:43   
 "The Land of Spirit and Light (Part 2)" - 3:21   
 "The Land of Spirit and Light (Part 3)" - 4:33   
 "Fatima's Garden" - 10:01   
 "Fiesta Dominical" - 7:23   
 "O Ancient One" - 8:52   
 "Lament (Mankind)" (Cecil McBee, White) - 2:26

Personnel
Michael White - violin
Prince Lasha - piccolo, flute, alto flute, clarinet
Ed Kelly - piano
Bob King - classical guitar
Cecil McBee - bass
Kenneth Nash - percussion
Stanley Nash, Kenny Jenkins, and ABC Messenger delivery man - vocals

References

Impulse! Records albums
Michael White (violinist) albums
1973 albums